Chucky may refer to:

Chucky (name)
Chucky (character), a fictional character in the Child's Play franchise
Chucky: Slash & Dash, a 2013 video game
Chucky (TV series), a 2021 TV series
Chucky madtom (Noturus crypticus), endangered fish
Chucky, English language slang for Irish Republican, deriving from the pronunciation of their slogan ""

See also

Chuckie (disambiguation)
Chuck (disambiguation)
Chuckey Charles

Lists of people by nickname
Hypocorisms